Lassana Cassamá is a Guinea-Bissauan professional football manager. He is a coach of the Guinea-Bissau women's national football team.

References

Year of birth missing (living people)
Living people
Bissau-Guinean football managers
Place of birth missing (living people)